The 2019–20 Memphis Grizzlies season was the 25th season of the franchise in the National Basketball Association (NBA) and 19th in Memphis.

After the end of the 2018–19 season, and prior to the beginning of the 2019–20 season, Robert Pera announced a restructuring of the Grizzlies' basketball operations department: “In order to put our team on the path to sustainable success, it was necessary to change our approach to basketball operations".

On April 11, 2019, the Grizzlies fired head coach J. B. Bickerstaff after missing the playoffs. Additionally, General Manager Chris Wallace was reallocated to a role exclusively in player scouting. Jason Wexler was announced as Team President and Zachary Kleiman was promoted to General Manager, as the Executive Vice President of Basketball Operations.

On May 14, during the 2019 NBA Draft Lottery, the Grizzlies not only kept their first round selection this year, but rose up to the #2 pick in the process. The Grizzlies later found their new head coach on June 11 with Milwaukee Bucks assistant coach Taylor Jenkins. On June 19, 2019, it was announced that longtime Grizzlies point guard Mike Conley will be traded to the Utah Jazz after spending his first 12 years in the league with the Grizzlies. It is for the first time since the  season that Conley is not with the Grizzlies.

The Grizzlies selected Ja Morant as the second pick in the 2019 NBA draft. Morant was named the NBA Rookie of the Year following an impressive first season in Memphis.

The season was suspended by the league officials following the games of March 11 after it was reported that Rudy Gobert tested positive for COVID-19. On June 4, the Grizzlies were one of the 22 teams invited to the NBA Bubble. On August 15, they fell to the Portland Trail Blazers in the league's first ever play-in game to end the season.

Draft

The Memphis Grizzlies hold a first round pick for the 2019 NBA Draft. Before the night of the NBA draft lottery, the Grizzlies risked losing their first round pick if it fell outside of the top 8 due to a prior trade with the Boston Celtics. However, their sole first round pick rose up six spots in the draft to go from the already safe #8 selection to the second overall pick of the draft. On the night before the 2019 NBA draft began, the Grizzlies agreed to trade long-standing point guard Mike Conley Jr. to the Utah Jazz in exchange for Grayson Allen, Jae Crowder, Kyle Korver, a future first round pick, and the Jazz's first round pick this year at #23, although the trade would not be completed until July 6 due to salary cap reasons.

With the second pick of the draft, the Grizzlies selected point guard Ja Morant from Murray State University. The Grizzlies also received Canadian power forward Brandon Clarke after he was selected by the Oklahoma City Thunder out of Gonzaga with the 21st pick and immediately traded to the Grizzlies for the 23rd pick (via the Utah Jazz), and the Grizzlies' 2024 second round pick.

Roster

Standings

Division

Conference

Game log

Preseason 

|- style="background:#cfc;"
| 1
| October 6
| Haifa
| 
| Jaren Jackson Jr. (19)
| Bruno Caboclo (9)
| Jones, Morant (7)
| FedExForum10,515
| 1–0
|- style="background:#cfc;"
| 2
| October 8
| New Zealand
| 
| Allen, Jackson Jr. (18)
| Brandon Clarke (12)
| Ja Morant (10)
| FedExForum10,259
| 2–0
|- style="background:#fcc;"
| 3
| October 14
| Charlotte
| 
| Brandon Clarke (16)
| Brandon Clarke (12)
| Ja Morant (6)
| FedExForum11,292
| 2–1
|- style="background:#cfc;"
| 4
| October 16
| @ Oklahoma City
| 
| Dillon Brooks (30)
| Jackson Jr., Konchar (10)
| Kyle Anderson (5)
| Chesapeake Energy Arena1,000
| 3–1
|- style="background:#fcc;"
| 5
| October 18
| @ San Antonio
| 
| Ja Morant (16)
| Caboclo, Crowder (11)
| Ja Morant (6)
| AT&T Center12,664
| 3–2

Regular season 

|- style="background:#fcc;"
| 1
| October 23
| @ Miami
| 
| Jaren Jackson Jr. (17)
| Brandon Clarke (7)
| Tyus Jones (7)
| American Airlines Arena19,600
| 0–1
|- style="background:#fcc;"
| 2
| October 25
| Chicago
| 
| Jaren Jackson Jr. (23)
| Jonas Valanciunas (13)
| Anderson, Morant (5)
| FedExForum17,794
| 0–2
|- style="background:#cfc;"
| 3
| October 27
| Brooklyn
| 
| Ja Morant (30)
| Jonas Valanciunas (11)
| Ja Morant (9)
| FedExForum15,517
| 1–2
|- style="background:#fcc;"
| 4
| October 29
| @ L. A. Lakers
| 
| Ja Morant (16)
| Jonas Valanciunas (11)
| Dillon Brooks (4)
| Staples Center18,997
| 1–3

|- style="background:#fcc;"
| 5
| November 2
| Phoenix
| 
| Ja Morant (24)
| Brandon Clarke (11)
| Ja Morant (7)
| FedExForum14,144
| 1–4
|- style="background:#fcc;"
| 6
| November 4
| Houston
| 
| Ja Morant (23)
| Jonas Valanciunas (10)
| Ja Morant (6)
| FedExForum14,197
| 1–5
|- style="background:#cfc;"
| 7
| November 6
| Minnesota
| 
| Dillon Brooks (31)
| Jonas Valanciunas (14)
| Tyus Jones (5)
| FedExForum13,503
| 2–5
|- style="background:#fcc;"
| 8
| November 8
| @ Orlando
| 
| Jonas Valanciunas (15)
| Jonas Valanciunas (9)
| Ja Morant (7)
| Amway Center17,021
| 2–6
|- style="background:#fcc;"
| 9
| November 9
| Dallas
| 
| Jaren Jackson Jr. (23)
| Hill, Anderson, Brooks (5)
| Tyus Jones (8)
| FedExForum15,753
| 2–7
|- style="background:#cfc;"
| 10
| November 11
| @ San Antonio
| 
| Jaren Jackson Jr. (24)
| Jonas Valanciunas (12)
| Tyus Jones (6)
| AT&T Center18,627
| 3–7
|- style="background:#cfc;"
| 11
| November 13
| @ Charlotte
| 
| Ja Morant (23)
| Jonas Valanciunas (13)
| Ja Morant (11)
| Spectrum Center13,155
| 4–7
|- style="background:#cfc;"
| 12
| November 15
| Utah
| 
| Ja Morant (25)
| Jae Crowder (10)
| Ja Morant (8)
| FedExForum16,422
| 5–7
|- style="background:#fcc;"
| 13
| November 17
| Denver
| 
| Jaren Jackson Jr. (22)
| Jonas Valanciunas (10)
| Tyus Jones (7)
| FedExForum14,227
| 5–8
|- style="background:#fcc;"
| 14
| November 19
| Golden State
| 
| Ja Morant (20)
| Jae Crowder (11)
| Ja Morant (6)
| FedExForum14,511
| 5–9
|- style="background:#fcc;"
| 15
| November 23
| L. A. Lakers
| 
| Ja Morant (26)
| Brandon Clarke (11)
| Jones, Morant (6)
| FedExForum17,794
| 5–10
|- style="background:#fcc;"
| 16
| November 25
| @ Indiana
| 
| Jaren Jackson Jr. (28)
| Jonas Valanciunas (11)
| Ja Morant (10)
| Bankers Life Fieldhouse15,141
| 5–11
|- style="background:#fcc;"
| 17
| November 27
| L. A. Clippers
| 
| Jonas Valanciunas (30)
| Jonas Valanciunas (16)
| Ja Morant (11)
| FedExForum16,721
| 5–12
|- style="background:#fcc;"
| 18
| November 29
| Utah
| 
| Jonas Valanciunas (22)
| Jonas Valanciunas (17)
| Jackson Jr., Morant (4)
| FedExForum16,605
| 5–13

|- style="background:#cfc;"
| 19
| December 1
| @ Minnesota
| 
| Dillon Brooks (26)
| Bruno Caboclo (13)
| De'Anthony Melton (8)
| Target Center12,276
| 6–13
|- style="background:#fcc;"
| 20
| December 2
| Indiana
| 
| Jaren Jackson Jr. (31)
| De'Anthony Melton (9)
| Tyus Jones (6)
| FedExForum11,919
| 6–14
|- style="background:#fcc;"
| 21
| December 4
| @ Chicago
| 
| Jonas Valanciunas (32)
| Jonas Valanciunas (13)
| De'Anthony Melton (7)
| United Center15,017
| 6–15
|- style="background:#fcc;"
| 22
| December 7
| @ Utah
| 
| Jaren Jackson Jr. (26)
| Jonas Valanciunas (6)
| Tyus Jones (7)
| Vivint Smart Home Arena18,306
| 6–16
|- style="background:#cfc;"
| 23
| December 9
| @ Golden State
| 
| Ja Morant (26)
| Jonas Valanciunas (10)
| Jones, Morant (7)
| Chase Center18,064
| 7–16
|- style="background:#cfc;"
| 24
| December 11
| @ Phoenix
| 
| Dillon Brooks (27)
| Jonas Valanciunas (9)
| Ja Morant (6)
| Talking Stick Resort Arena12,254
| 8–16
|- style="background:#fcc;"
| 25
| December 13
| Milwaukee
| 
| Jaren Jackson Jr. (43)
| Jae Crowder (11)
| Tyus Jones (7)
| FedExForum16,109
| 8–17
|- style="background:#cfc;"
| 26
| December 14
| Washington
| 
| Dillon Brooks (27)
| Jonas Valanciunas (12)
| Tyus Jones (9)
| FedExForum15,631
| 9–17
|- style="background:#cfc;"
| 27
| December 16
| Miami
| 
| Jonas Valanciunas (21)
| Jonas Valanciunas (10)
| Ja Morant (10)
| FedExForum14,021
| 10–17
|- style="background:#fcc;"
| 28
| December 18
| @ Oklahoma City
| 
| Brandon Clarke (27)
| Jonas Valanciunas (9)
| Ja Morant (7)
| Chesapeake Energy Arena18,203
| 10–18
|- style="background:#fcc;"
| 29
| December 20
| @ Cleveland
| 
| Jaren Jackson Jr. (24)
| Jonas Valanciunas (14)
| Ja Morant (11)
| Rocket Mortgage FieldHouse19,432
| 10–19
|- style="background:#cfc;"
| 30
| December 21
| Sacramento
| 
| Jaren Jackson Jr. (18)
| Jae Crowder (10)
| Jae Crowder (5)
| FedExForum15,603
| 11–19
|- style="background:#fcc;"
| 31
| December 23
| San Antonio
| 
| Jaren Jackson Jr. (22)
| Jaren Jackson Jr. (12)
| Crowder, Morant (4)
| FedExForum16,776
| 11–20
|- style="background:#cfc;"
| 32
| December 26
| @ Oklahoma City
| 
| Jonas Valanciunas (21)
| Jae Crowder (10)
| Kyle Anderson (7)
| Chesapeake Energy Arena18,203
| 12–20
|- style="background:#fcc;"
| 33
| December 28
| @ Denver
| 
| Jaren Jackson Jr. (20)
| Jonas Valanciunas (10)
| Ja Morant (8)
| Pepsi Center19,697
| 12–21
|- style="background:#cfc;"
| 34
| December 29
| Charlotte
| 
| Dillon Brooks (20)
| Jaren Jackson Jr. (12)
| Ja Morant (7)
| FedExForum16,842
| 13–21

|- style="background:#fcc;"
| 35
| January 2
| @ Sacramento
| 
| Ja Morant (23)
| Jonas Valanciunas (12)
| Ja Morant (7)
| Golden 1 Center17,351
| 13–22
|- style="background:#cfc;"
| 36
| January 4
| @ L. A. Clippers
| 
| Jae Crowder (27)
| Jonas Valanciunas (12)
| Ja Morant (9)
| Staples Center19,068
| 14–22
|- style="background:#cfc;"
| 37
| January 5
| @ Phoenix
| 
| Jonas Valanciunas (30)
| Valanciunas, Jackson Jr. (8)
| Ja Morant (7)
| Talking Stick Resort Arena14,181
| 15–22
|- style="background:#cfc;"
| 38
| January 7
| Minnesota
| 
| Dillon Brooks (28)
| Jae Crowder (8)
| Ja Morant (7)
| FedExForum14,117
| 16–22
|- style="background:#cfc;"
| 39
| January 10
| San Antonio
| 
| Jaren Jackson Jr. (24)
| Clarke, Valanciunas (9)
| Ja Morant (14)
| FedExForum16,448
| 17–22
|- style="background:#cfc;"
| 40
| January 12
| Golden State
| 
| Jonas Valanciunas (31)
| Jonas Valanciunas (19)
| Ja Morant (10)
| FedExForum16,408
| 18–22
|- style="background:#cfc;"
| 41
| January 14
| Houston
| 
| Ja Morant (26)
| Brandon Clarke (7)
| Ja Morant (8)
| FedExForum16,181
| 19–22
|- style="background:#cfc;"
| 42
| January 17
| Cleveland
| 
| Dillon Brooks (26)
| Jonas Valanciunas (18)
| Ja Morant (8)
| FedExForum17,102
| 20–22
|- style="background:#fcc;"
| 43
| January 20
| New Orleans
| 
| Dillon Brooks (31)
| Jonas Valanciunas (11)
| Ja Morant (9)
| FedExForum17,794
| 20–23
|- style="background:#fcc;"
| 44
| January 22
| @ Boston
| 
| Jonas Valanciunas (16)
| Jonas Valanciunas (13)
| Ja Morant (5)
| TD Garden19,156
| 20–24
|- style="background:#cfc;"
| 45
| January 24
| @ Detroit
| 
| Jaren Jackson Jr. (29)
| Brandon Clarke (11)
| Ja Morant (12)
| Little Caesars Arena14,583
| 21–24
|- style="background:#cfc;"
| 46
| January 26
| Phoenix
| 
| Ja Morant (23)
| Kyle Anderson (12)
| Ja Morant (8)
| FedExForum17,214
| 22–24
|- style="background:#cfc;"
| 47
| January 28
| Denver
| 
| Dillon Brooks (24)
| Jonas Valančiūnas (12)
| Jones, Morant (7)
| FedExForum14,365
| 23–24
|- style="background:#cfc;"
| 48
| January 29
| @ New York
| 
| Dillon Brooks (27)
| Jonas Valančiūnas (13)
| Ja Morant (10)
| Madison Square Garden18,768
| 24–24
|- style="background:#fcc;"
| 49
| January 31
| @ New Orleans
| 
| Jonas Valančiūnas (18)
| Jonas Valančiūnas (8)
| Anderson, Jones, Morant (3)
| Smoothie King Center18,362
| 24–25

|- style="background:#cfc;"
| 50
| February 3
| Detroit
| 
| Jonas Valančiūnas (26)
| Jonas Valančiūnas (17)
| Ja Morant (7)
| FedExForum14,597
| 25–25
|- style="background:#cfc;"
| 51
| February 5
| @ Dallas
| 
| Ja Morant (21)
| Jonas Valančiūnas (10)
| Kyle Anderson (6)
| American Airlines Center20,069
| 26–25
|- style="background:#fcc;"
| 52
| February 7
| @ Philadelphia
| 
| Ja Morant (15)
| Jonas Valančiūnas (10)
| Tyus Jones (7)
| Wells Fargo Center20,779
| 26–26
|- style="background:#cfc;"
| 53
| February 9
| @ Washington
| 
| Ja Morant (27)
| Jonas Valančiūnas (18)
| Ja Morant (10)
| Capital One Arena17,251
| 27–26
|- style="background:#cfc;"
| 54
| February 12
| Portland
| 
| Brandon Clarke (27)
| Jonas Valančiūnas (18)
| Ja Morant (9)
| FedExForum16,889
| 28–26
|- style="background:#fcc;"
| 55
| February 20
| @ Sacramento
| 
| De'Anthony Melton (24)
| Clarke, Valančiūnas (11)
| Tyus Jones (6)
| Golden 1 Center17,078
| 28–27
|- style="background:#fcc;"
| 56
| February 21
| @ L. A. Lakers
| 
| Josh Jackson (20)
| Jonas Valančiūnas (11)
| Tyus Jones (5)
| Staples Center18,997
| 28–28
|- style="background:#fcc;"
| 57
| February 24
| @ L. A. Clippers
| 
| Ja Morant (16)
| Gorgui Dieng (10)
| Dillon Brooks (5)
| Staples Center19,068
| 28–29
|- style="background:#fcc;"
| 58
| February 26
| @ Houston
| 
| Dillon Brooks (22)
| Jonas Valančiūnas (10)
| Ja Morant (9)
| Toyota Center18,055
| 28–30
|- style="background:#fcc;"
| 59
| February 28
| Sacramento
| 
| Dillon Brooks (32)
| Jonas Valančiūnas (25)
| Ja Morant (11)
| FedExForum17,794
| 28–31
|- style="background:#cfc;"
| 60
| February 29
| L. A. Lakers
| 
| Ja Morant (27)
| Jonas Valančiūnas (20)
| Ja Morant (14)
| FedExForum17,794
| 29–31

|- style="background:#cfc;"
| 61
| March 2
| @ Atlanta
| 
| Gorgui Dieng (17)
| Jonas Valančiūnas (15)
| Tyus Jones (9)
| State Farm Arena16,207
| 30–31
|- style="background:#cfc;"
| 62
| March 4
| @ Brooklyn
| 
| Josh Jackson (19)
| Jonas Valančiūnas (16)
| Tyus Jones (6)
| Barclays Center16,941
| 31–31
|- style="background:#fcc;"
| 63
| March 6
| @ Dallas
| 
| Josh Jackson (16)
| Jonas Valančiūnas (11)
| Ja Morant (8)
| American Airlines Center20,370
| 31–32
|- style="background:#cfc;"
| 64
| March 7
| Atlanta
| 
| Jonas Valančiūnas (27)
| Jonas Valančiūnas (17)
| Ja Morant (6)
| FedExForum17,117
| 32–32
|- style="background:#fcc;"
| 65
| March 10
| Orlando
| 
| Jonas Valančiūnas (27)
| Jonas Valančiūnas (16)
| De'Anthony Melton (6)
| FedExForum15,388
| 32–33

|- style="background:#fcc;"
| 66
| July 31
| @ Portland
| 
| Jaren Jackson Jr. (33)
| Brandon Clarke (7)
| Ja Morant (11)
| The ArenaNo In-Person Attendance
| 32–34
|- style="background:#fcc;"
| 67
| August 2
| San Antonio
| 
| Ja Morant (25)
| Jonas Valančiūnas (9)
| Ja Morant (9)
| Visa Athletic CenterNo In-Person Attendance
| 32–35
|- style="background:#fcc;"
| 68
| August 3
| @ New Orleans
| 
| Jaren Jackson Jr. (22)
| Jonas Valančiūnas (13)
| Ja Morant (8)
| HP Field HouseNo In-Person Attendance
| 32–36
|- style="background:#fcc;"
| 69
| August 5
| @ Utah
| 
| Dillon Brooks (23)
| Jonas Valančiūnas (14)
| Ja Morant (9)
| HP Field HouseNo In-Person Attendance
| 32–37
|- style="background:#cfc;"
| 70
| August 7
| Oklahoma City
| 
| Dillon Brooks (22)
| Jonas Valančiūnas (11)
| Ja Morant (9)
| Visa Athletic CenterNo In-Person Attendance
| 33–37
|- style="background:#fcc;"
| 71
| August 9
| @ Toronto
| 
| Dillon Brooks (25)
| Jonas Valančiūnas (10)
| Ja Morant (10)
| Visa Athletic CenterNo In-Person Attendance
| 33–38
|- style="background:#fcc;"
| 72
| August 11
| Boston
| 
| Ja Morant (26)
| Jonas Valančiūnas (10)
| Ja Morant (13)
| HP Field HouseNo In-Person Attendance
| 33–39
|- style="background:#cfc;"
| 73
| August 13
| Milwaukee
| 
| Dillon Brooks (31)
| Jonas Valančiūnas (19)
| Jonas Valančiūnas (12)
| Visa Athletic CenterNo In-Person Attendance
| 34–39

|- style="background:#;"
| 66
| March 12
| @ Portland
| 
|
|
|
| Moda Center
|
|- style="background:#;"
| 67
| March 14
| @ Utah
| 
|
|
|
| Vivint Smart Home Arena
|
|- style="background:#;"
| 68
| March 16
| @ San Antonio
| 
|
|
|
| AT&T Center
|
|- style="background:#;"
| 69
| March 17
| Oklahoma City
| 
|
|
|
| FedExForum
|
|- style="background:#;"
| 70
| March 19
| @ Milwaukee
| 
|
|
|
| Fiserv Forum
|
|- style="background:#;"
| 71
| March 21
| New Orleans
| 
|
|
|
| FedExForum
|
|- style="background:#;"
| 72
| March 24
| @ New Orleans
| 
|
|
|
| Smoothie King Center
|
|- style="background:#;"
| 73
| March 25
| Boston
| 
|
|
|
| FedExForum
|
|- style="background:#;"
| 74
| March 28
| Toronto
| 
|
|
|
| FedExForum
|
|- style="background:#;"
| 75
| March 30
| @ Toronto
| 
|
|
|
| Scotiabank Arena
|
|- style="background:#;"
| 76
| April 1
| New York
| 
|
|
|
| FedExForum
|
|- style="background:#;"
| 77
| April 3
| Dallas
| 
|
|
|
| FedExForum
|
|- style="background:#;"
| 78
| April 5
| @ Portland
| 
|
|
|
| Moda Center
|
|- style="background:#;"
| 79
| April 7
| @ Denver
| 
|
|
|
| Pepsi Center
|
|- style="background:#;"
| 80
| April 11
| Oklahoma City
| 
|
|
|
| FedExForum
|
|- style="background:#;"
| 81
| April 13
| Philadelphia
| 
|
|
|
| FedExForum
|
|- style="background:#;"
| 82
| April 15
| @ Houston
| 
|
|
|
| Toyota Center
|

Play-in

|- style="background:#fcc;" 
| 1
| August 15
| Portland
| 
| Ja Morant (35)
| Jonas Valančiūnas (17)
| Kyle Anderson (9)
| HP Field HouseNo In-Person Attendance
| 0–1

Transactions

Trades

Free agency

Re-signed

Additions

Subtractions

References

Memphis Grizzlies
Memphis Grizzlies seasons
Memphis Grizzlies
Memphis Grizzlies
Events in Memphis, Tennessee